The 1959 Orange Bowl featured the Syracuse Orangemen (8–1) and the Oklahoma Sooners (9–1) in the 25th annual Orange Bowl, played on Thursday, January 1, 1959, at the Orange Bowl in Miami, Florida.

Background
This was Oklahoma's fourth Orange Bowl in six seasons while Syracuse was making their second Orange Bowl appearance in six seasons.   Oklahoma had won its thirteenth straight Big Seven title and Syracuse was an independent. The first of the day's four major bowl games, kickoff was at 1 p.m. EST on CBS television, and Oklahoma was a thirteen-point favorite.

Game summary
Oklahoma scored early with a Prentice Gautt rushing touchdown three minutes into the game. With the quarter running down, Syracuse fumbled the ball back to the Sooners after driving to the Sooners red zone. With 2:56 left in the quarter, Brewster Hobby caught a lateral and then passed to Ross Coyle, who ran 79 yards for the touchdown and a 14–0 lead. After a scoreless second quarter, Hobby sealed the game when he returned a Syracuse punt 40 yards for a touchdown to make it 21–0 after three quarters.

Mark Weber gave the Orangemen their only points on his touchdown run after a 69-yard drive, but the two-point conversion failed on an incomplete pass, and that was the end of the scoring. Despite Syracuse's run attack, two fumbles by the backs and two passes that were intercepted doomed the Orange as Oklahoma won their fourth Orange Bowl in six seasons.

Aftermath
In the following season, Syracuse went undefeated and won the national title.

Statistics

Source:

References

Orange Bowl
Orange Bowl
Oklahoma Sooners football bowl games
Syracuse Orange football bowl games
1959 in sports in Florida
January 1959 sports events in the United States